Rick Francis (born 1958 or 1959) is an American politician. He is a member of the Missouri House of Representatives from the 145th District, serving since 2017. He is a member of the Republican party.

References

Living people
1950s births
Republican Party members of the Missouri House of Representatives
21st-century American politicians